My Old School can refer to:

 My Old School (song), single from a Steely Dan album
 My Old School (2013 film), about an abandoned school in Rhode Island
 My Old School (2022 film), about the Brandon Lee affair